The following is a list of squads for each national team competing at the 2022 AFC Futsal Asian Cup. The tournament was held in Kuwait from 27 September to 8 October 2022. The 16 national teams involved in the tournament were required by the AFC to register a squad of 14 players, including two goalkeepers.

The age listed for each player is as of 27 September 2022, the first day of the tournament.

Group A

Kuwait
The final squad was announced on 26 September.

Head coach:  Cacau

Iraq
Head coach:  Mohammad Nazemasharieh

Thailand
The final squad was announced on 23 September.

Head coach:  Carlos Núñez Gago

Oman
The final squad was announced on 26 September.

Head coach: Younis Al-Fahdi

Group B

Uzbekistan
The final squad was announced on 22 September.

Head coach: Bakhodir Akhmedov

Bahrain
The final squad was announced on 26 September.

Head coach:  Lino Gomes

Tajikistan
The final squad was announced on 20 September.

Head coach: Pairav Vakhidov

Turkmenistan
Head coach: Guwanç Kanaýew

Group C

Iran
The final squad was announced on 27 September.

Head coach: Vahid Shamsaei

Lebanon
The final squad was announced on 24 September.

Head coach:  João Almeida

Chinese Taipei
The final squad was announced on 22 September 2022.

Head coach:  José Adil Amarante

Indonesia
The final squad was announced on 19 September.

Head coach:  Mohammad Hashemzadeh

Group D

Japan
The final squad was announced on 18 September 2022.

Head coach: Kenichiro Kogure

Vietnam
The final squad was announced on 24 September.

Head coach:  Diego Giustozzi

South Korea
Head coach: Lee Sang-jin

Saudi Arabia
The final squad was announced on 22 September.

Head coach:  Andreu Plaza

References

External links
 Official website

squads
Futsal tournament squads